Coelonia is a genus of moths in the family Sphingidae. The genus was erected by Walter Rothschild and Karl Jordan in 1903.

Species
Coelonia brevis Rothschild & Jordan 1915
Coelonia fulvinotata (Butler 1875)
Coelonia solani (Boisduval 1833)

References

Acherontiini
Taxa named by Walter Rothschild
Taxa named by Karl Jordan
Moth genera